Tom Forzani (born June 15, 1951) is a former Canadian football wide receiver for the CFL Calgary Stampeders. He played from 1973 to 1983 for the Stampeders.

He is one of three Forzani brothers to play for their hometown Stampeders, along with Joe and John. Forzani's son, Johnny Forzani, also  played for the Stampeders.

Tom was an all-star selection at wide receiver in 1973, '74 and '77. 
Tom lead the Stampeders in receiving in 5 season and had 50 or more catches in 7 seasons. He had at least one reception in 11 consecutive season, tied for the club lead with Allen Pitts.

His No. 22 was retired by the Stampeders in 1984.

He played college football at Utah State University, as did brothers Joe and John. Son Johnny played for Washington State University.

References

 Calgary Herald
 CFL News
 Utah State

1951 births
Living people
Calgary Stampeders players
Canadian football wide receivers
Canadian football people from Calgary
Players of Canadian football from Alberta
Utah State Aggies football players